George Johnstone, (April 18, 1846 – March 8, 1921) was elected to the U.S. House of Representatives for South Carolina's 3rd congressional district.  He served for one term from 1891 to 1893.

External links

1846 births
1921 deaths
Democratic Party members of the United States House of Representatives from South Carolina
People from Newberry, South Carolina